Georgi Petrov may refer to:

Georgi Petrov (judoka) (born 1954), former Bulgarian judoka
Georgi Petrov (badminton) (born 1980), Bulgarian badminton player
Georgi Petrov (footballer, born 1974), former Bulgarian  footballer
Georgi Petrov (footballer, born 1991), Bulgarian footballer for Lokomotiv Plovdiv
Georgi Petrov (ice hockey) (born 1988), Kazakh ice hockey player